The second season of the American action drama television series S.W.A.T. premiered on September 27, 2018, and ended on May 16, 2019 on CBS with 23 episodes.

Cast and characters

Main 
 Shemar Moore as Sergeant II Daniel "Hondo" Harrelson Jr.
 Stephanie Sigman as Captain Jessica Cortez
 Alex Russell as Officer III James "Jim" Street
 Lina Esco as Officer III Christina "Chris" Alonso
 Kenny Johnson as Officer III+1 Dominique Luca
 David Lim as Officer III Victor Tan
 Patrick St. Esprit as Commander Robert Hicks
 Jay Harrington as Sergeant II David "Deacon" Kay

Recurring 
 Peter Onorati as Sergeant II Jeff Mumford
 Lou Ferrigno Jr. as Donovan Rocker
 Sherilyn Fenn as Karen Street
 Bre Blair as Annie Kay
 Nikiva Dionne as Nia Wells

Guest 
 DeShae Frost as Darryl Henderson
 Michael Beach as Leroy Henderson
 Cathy Cahlin Ryan as Dr. Wendy Hughes
 Obba Babatundé as Daniel Harrelson Sr.
 Sumalee Montano as Gwen
 Daniel Lissing as Ty
 Claire Coffee as Kira
 Michael O'Neill as Carl Luca
 Sofia Vassilieva as Lauren
 Shanley Caswell as Sarah
 Alimi Ballard as Officer Thompson
 Dominic Hoffman as Ben Mosley
 Shawn Ashmore as William Tanner
 Christian Kane as Mr. X
 David Marciano as Steve Billings
 Mark Espinoza as Jorge

Episodes

Production 
On March 27, 2018, CBS renewed the series for a second season

Patrick St. Esprit was promoted to series regular this season.

Ratings

Home media

References

External links

2018 American television seasons
2019 American television seasons